is a railway station in Suma-ku, Kobe, Hyōgo Prefecture, Japan.

As there are no other railways lines serving northern Suma, a large number of passengers use this station, especially during the morning rush hour.

Lines
Kobe Municipal Subway
Seishin-Yamate Line Station S11

Railway stations in Hyōgo Prefecture
Stations of Kobe Municipal Subway
Railway stations in Japan opened in 1977